Marisela Cantú Mata (born 25 October 1990) is a Mexican artistic gymnast and part of the national team.

She participated at the 2008 Summer Olympics. 
She also competed at world championships, including the  2010 World Artistic Gymnastics Championships in Rotterdam, the Netherlands.

References

External links

1990 births
Living people
Mexican female artistic gymnasts
Place of birth missing (living people)
Gymnasts at the 2011 Pan American Games
Gymnasts at the 2008 Summer Olympics
Olympic gymnasts of Mexico
Pan American Games medalists in gymnastics
Pan American Games bronze medalists for Mexico
Medalists at the 2011 Pan American Games
21st-century Mexican women